Ross Archibald (born 29 September 1994) is an Australian professional football player who plays as a midfielder for Altona Magic SC in the National Premier Leagues Victoria.

Club career
Born in Queensland, Archibald made his top tier debut for Melbourne Heart in March 2014, coming on as a substitute for Harry Kewell in a Melbourne Derby. Archibald returned to Bentleigh Greens ahead of the 2016 NPLV season after six months in Germany with Fortuna Düsseldorf II.

References

External links
 

1994 births
Living people
Australian soccer players
Association football midfielders
Melbourne City FC players
Altona Magic SC players
A-League Men players
National Premier Leagues players
People educated at Brisbane Boys' College